Šentgotard ( or) is a village in the hills east of Trojane in central Slovenia. It lies in the Municipality of Zagorje ob Savi. The area is part of the traditional region of Upper Carniola. It is now included with the rest of the municipality in the Central Sava Statistical Region.

Church

The local parish church, from which the settlement gets its name, is dedicated to Saint Gotthard and belongs to the Roman Catholic Archdiocese of Ljubljana. It dates to the 18th century.

Notable people
France Cukjati, the vice-chairman of the National Assembly of Slovenia, was born in Šentgotard in 1943.

References

External links

Šentgotard on Geopedia

Populated places in the Municipality of Zagorje ob Savi